Otto Hauglin (7 February 1942 – 18 November 2012) was a Norwegian sociologist and politician for the Socialist Left Party (SV). He was an elected member of the Parliament of Norway from 1973 to 1977, representing Østfold county.

Personal life
Hauglin was born in Fredrikstad, a son of industrial worker Jens Einar Hauglin and Else Helene Lundheim.

He died in Oslo in November 2012.

Selected works
Rapport fra Nærby (1970).

References

1942 births
2012 deaths
People from Fredrikstad
Members of the Storting
Socialist Left Party (Norway) politicians
Østfold politicians
20th-century Norwegian politicians